Harold D. Roth (born 1949) is a professor of religious studies and the Director of the Contemplative Studies Initiative at Brown University. Roth is a specialist in Methods of Textual Criticism and Textual History, Classical Chinese Religious Thought, Classical Daoism, the Comparative Study of Mysticism and one of the pioneers of the new interdisciplinary academic field of Contemplative Studies.

Biography
During an academic career spanning over three decades, Roth has done ground-breaking work in three major intellectual fields. In the first, textual criticism, following the lead of the late SOAS professor Paul Thompson, Roth did the first complete textual history of a major Classical Chinese philosophical work, which he published in his first book, The Textual History of the Huai-nan Tzu. Working towards the goal of establishing modern critical editions of all the major extant works of the classical period, Roth developed a distinctive method he called "Filiation Analysis", a technique for determining the broadest range of possibly authentic textual variants using the bare minimum number of editions. This is detailed in his very first publication,  "Filiation Analysis and the Textual Criticism of the Huai-nan Tzu". It is further developed as a model for all classical Chinese philosophical texts in a later publication, "Text and Edition in Early Chinese Philosophical Literature".

The second major area in which Roth has done pioneering work is in reconstructing the lost history and contemplative dimensions of the late Warring States and early Han dynasty tradition that he dubbed "inner cultivation". It is this tradition that was given the moniker "Daoism" by the Grand Historian Sima Tan circa 110 BCE.  Beginning with three publications in the early to mid 1990s, "Psychology and Self-Cultivation in Early Taoistic Thought", "Who Compiled the Chuang Tzu?", and "Redaction Criticism and the Early History of Taoism", Roth began a detailed textual analysis of classical Chinese texts on inner cultivation demonstrating that they contained a distinctive set of technical terms that could be organized under three philosophical categories: cosmology, psychology/inner cultivation, and political thought. Expanding the work of A.C. Graham, he further determined that these extant sources of inner cultivation could be organized into three distinctive philosophical groupings, "Individualist", Primitivist, and Syncretist and argued these could be considered different phases in the development of this classical Daoist tradition. Roth systematized these arguments in providing the intellectual context for his translation of a short and distinctive text entitled Neiye ("Inward Training"), one of 76 works in the Guanzi 管子 compendium, published in his second book, Original Tao: Inward Training and the Foundations of Taoist Mysticism and returned to them in a recent article detailed the contributions to the development of the foundational philosophical idea of li 理 (Pattern, Principle) made by this classical Daoist tradition in "The Classical Daoist Concept of Li and Early Chinese Cosmology".

In developing these theories about the inner cultivation tradition Roth broke new ground in systematically applying the methods of the philosophical analysis of different traditions of mystical experience to the classical Chinese religious traditions. In addition to being summarized in Original Tao, his work in this area is detailed in a number of important other publications: "Evidence for Stages of Meditation in Early Taoism", "Lao Tzu in the Context of Early Taoist Mystical Praxis", and  "Bimodal Mystical Experience in the 'Qiwulun' of Zhuangzi".

Starting when he entered the Ph.D. program at the University of Toronto in 1975, Roth began a fascination with the early Han dynasty  (139 BCE) philosophical compendium, the Huainanzi  淮南子, until recently the last great untranslated work of classical Chinese philosophy. Intended as a comprehensive multi-authored text detailing all the fields of knowledge with which the Chinese emperor needed to be conversant, the Huainanzi contains chapters on cosmology and cosmogony, astronomy, geography, rulership, and warfare, to name a few of its major topics. Roth has argued that while the Huainanzi is inclusive of a very wide range philosophical ideas from many traditions, that its overarching intellectual context is provided by the inner cultivation tradition of classical Daoism. After working on the textual history of this major work in his first book, in the mid 1990s Roth developed a project for the first complete English translation with colleague John Major and, eventually, a small cohort of additional scholars that included, most importantly, Sarah Queen and Andrew Meyer. Together they succeeded in finally publishing a complete translation, The Huainanzi:  A Guide to the Theory and Practice of Government in Early Han China and an abridged translation, The Essential Huainanzi. In addition to his work on these translations and to his first book, Roth has published his ideas on the philosophy of the Huainanzi  in a number of publications, including "The Concept of Human Nature in the Huai-nan Tzu", "Nature and Self-Cultivation in Huainanzi's 'Original Way'", "Daoist Inner Cultivation Thought and the Textual Structure of the Huainanzi", and "Huainanzi 淮 南 子and Early Han Daoism".

Roth has not only been a leader in developing the new academic field of "Contemplative Studies", he is also the person who first coined the term. Combining the disciplines of the relevant Brain Sciences, Humanities, and Creative Arts around the systematic third and first-person study of contemplative experiences, across cultures and across time, this new field presents bold new pedagogies and research techniques that return the unbiased perspective of the experiencing subject to both classroom and laboratory. Inspired by the work of scientists such as Francisco Varela, James Austin, and Richard Davidson, philosophers such as William James and Evan Thompson, and educators such as John Dewey and Parker Palmer, Brown Contemplative Studies has served as a model for research institutes and academic programs at many institutions of higher education throughout North America. Roth has helped pioneer the field through such publications as "Contemplative Studies: Prospects for a New Field", Columbia Teacher's College Record (2006); "Against Cognitive Imperialism", Religion East and West (2008); "Contemplative Studies:  Can It Flourish in the Religious Studies Classroom?" Meditation and  the Classroom: Contemplative Pedagogy for Religious Studies (2011);  and "A Pedagogy for the New Field of Contemplative Studies", Contemplative Approaches to Learning and Inquiry across Disciplines (2014). In 2014 Brown University became the first major North American Research University to establish a formal undergraduate concentration (major) in Contemplative Studies. This pioneering multi-disciplinary concentration requires 14 courses including a core set of 5 required courses in relevant Brain Sciences and Humanities. Students then choose a Sciences track that features Cognitive Psychology and Neuroscience or a Humanities Track that features Philosophy of Mind and Contemplative Religious Traditions. Art concentrations within the Humanities Track are also possible.

Additionally, Roth has served these academic fields in a variety of ways. He served on the board of directors of the Society for the Study of Chinese Religions for a decade starting in 1993, during which time he has also served on the editorial boards of four international journals of Daoism and Early Chinese Studies. In addition to this he was the founder and Co-Organizer of the New England Symposium on Chinese Thought (1988–93), the organizer of four academic panels at the Association for Asian Studies and American Oriental Society, and the Co-Organizer of the Second American-Japanese Conference on Taoist Studies (1998).  He has been a member of the initial Steering Committees for two groups within the American Academy of Religion, the Daoist Studies Section and the Contemplative Studies Group. He has been on the planning committees for the Mind and Life Institute Summer Research Institutes and the first and second International Symposia on Contemplative Studies (2012 and 2014).

Finally, a long time student of the Rinzai Zen Master Kyozan Joshu Sasaki (1907-2014), Roth was recently named to Chair the Publications Committee for Sasaki's teaching materials.

References

1949 births
Religious studies scholars
Living people
Princeton University alumni
McMaster University alumni
University of Toronto alumni
Brown University faculty